Anne Mary Perceval (14 January 1790 – 23 November 1876) was an English-born botanist and author in Lower Canada.

The daughter of Sir Charles Flower, Lord Mayor of London, she was born Anne Mary Flower. She married Michael Henry Perceval and came to Quebec City in 1810 when her husband was named customs collector. In 1815, with her husband, she acquired Spencer Wood, where she established an important garden of native plants. She identified about 150 species of plants from her collection to William Jackson Hooker, who included them in his Flora boreali-americana, or, the botany of the northern parts of British America. She also corresponded with botanist John Torrey.

She returned to Britain in 1828 following the death of her husband and died at Stornoway on the Isle of Lewis at the age of 86.

Plants which she collected are included in Canadian and American natural history collections, as well as collections in Paris and London.

References 

1790 births
1876 deaths
Canadian women botanists
English botanists
Daughters of baronets
19th-century Canadian botanists
19th-century Canadian non-fiction writers
19th-century Canadian women writers
19th-century Canadian women scientists
Canadian women non-fiction writers